Nissim Ezekiel  (16 December 1924 – 9 January 2004)  was an Indian Jewish poet, actor, playwright, editor and art critic. He was a foundational figure in postcolonial India's literary history, specifically for Indian Poetry in English.

He was awarded the Sahitya Akademi Award in 1983 for his collection, "Latter-Day Psalms", by the Sahitya Akademi, India's National Academy of Letters. Ezekiel has been applauded for his subtle, restrained and well crafted diction, dealing with common and mundane (simple) themes in a manner that manifests both cognitive profundity, as well as an unsentimental, realistic sensibility, that has been influential on the course of succeeding Indian English poetry.
Ezekiel enriched and established Indian English language poetry through his modernist innovations and techniques, which enlarged Indian English literature, moving it beyond purely spiritual and orientalist themes, to include a wider range of concerns and interests, including familial events, individual angst and skeptical societal introspection.

Early life
Ezekiel was born on 16 December 1924 in  Bombay (Mumbai)  in Maharashtra. His father was a professor of botany at Wilson College, and his mother was principal of her own school. The Ezekiels belonged to Mumbai's Marathi-speaking Jewish community known as the Bene Israel.

In 1947, Ezekiel earned a BA in Literature from Wilson College, Mumbai, Bombay University. In 1947-48, he taught English literature and published literary articles. After dabbling in politics for a while, he sailed to England in November 1948. He studied philosophy at Birkbeck College, London. After three and a half years, Ezekiel worked his way home as a deck-scrubber aboard a ship carrying arms to Indochina.

Career

Ezekiel's first book, A Time to change, appeared in 1952. He published another volume of poems, The deadly man in 1960. After working as an advertising copywriter and general manager of a picture frame company (1954–59), he co-founded the literary monthly Jumpo, in 1961. He became art critic of The Times of India (1964–66) and edited Poetry India (1966–67). From 1961 to 1972, he headed the English department of Mithibai College, Bombay. The Exact Name, his fifth book of poetry, was published in 1965. During this period he held short-term tenure as visiting professor at University of Leeds (1964) and University of Pondicherry (1967). In 1969, at the Writers Workshop, Ezekiel published his Three Plays which includes Nalini, Marriage Poem, The Sleep-walkers. A year later, he presented an art series of ten programmes for Indian television. In 1976, he translated Jawaharlal Nehru's poetry from English to Marathi, in collaboration with Vrinda Nabar, and co-edited a fiction and poetry anthology. His poem The Night of the Scorpion is used as study material in Indian and Colombian schools. Ezekiel also penned poems in ‘Indian English’  like the one based on instruction boards in his favourite Irani café. His poems are used in NCERT and ICSE English textbooks. His poem 'Background, Casually' is considered to be the most defining poem of his poetic and personal career.

Nissim Ezekiel is often considered the father of Modern Indian English poetry by many critics.

He was honoured with the Padmashri award by the President of India in 1988 and the Sahitya Akademi cultural award in 1983.

Editor

He edited The Indian P.E.N., official organ of P.E.N. All-India Centre, Bombay from The Theosophy Hall, New Marine Lines, and encouraged poets and writers.

He was the founding editor of Quest in 1954.

Death
After a prolonged battle with Alzheimer’s disease, Nissim Ezekiel died in Mumbai, on 9 January 2004 (aged 79).

Books by Ezekiel
 1952: Time To Change
 1953: Sixty poems
 1956: The Discovery of India
 1959: The Third
 1960: The Unfinished Man
 1965: The Exact Name
 1974: Snakeskin and Other Poems, translations of the Marathi poet Indira Sant
 1976: Hymns in Darkness
 1982: Latter-Day Psalms
 1989: Collected Poems 1952-88 OUP

Plays
 1969: The Three Plays Kolkata: Writers Workshop, India
 Do Not Call it Suicide  Madras: Macmillan India, 1993.

Prose
 
 Naipaul's India and mine- an essay

Editor
 1965: An Emerson Readers
 1969: A Joseph King Reader
 1990: Another India, anthology of fiction and poetry

Poems

 The Couple
 Enterprise
 A Time to Change                           
Philosophy
 Island
 For Elkana
 The Professor 
 Soap
 Marriage
 In the country cott
 How the english lessons ended 
 The Paradise Flycatcher
 Night of The Scorpion
 Goodbye party for Miss Pushpa T.S.
 Entertainment (was the best of one)
 “Background, Casually”
 Poet, Lover and Birdwatcher

Appearances in the following poetry Anthologies 
 The Golden Treasure of Writers Workshop Poetry (2008) ed. by Rubana Huq and published by Writers Workshop, Calcutta
 Ten Twentieth-Century Indian Poets (1976) ed. by R. Parthasarathy and published by Oxford University Press, New Delhi
 The Oxford India Anthology of Twelve Modern Indian Poets (1992) ed. by Arvind Krishna Mehrotra and published by Oxford University Press, New Delhi

Further reading
R. Raj Rao, Nissim Ezekiel: The Authorized Biography (Viking, 2000)
 Sanjit Mishra, The Poetic Art of Nissim Ezekiel  ( Atlantic, 2001)

See also

Indian English Poetry
Indian poetry in English
Indian English Literature
Indian literature

References

Bene Israel
Jewish poets
English-language poets from India
Indian male poets
1924 births
2004 deaths
Alumni of Birkbeck, University of London
Recipients of the Sahitya Akademi Award in English
Mithibai College
Writers from Mumbai
Indian magazine editors
20th-century Indian poets
Poets from Maharashtra
Recipients of the Padma Shri in literature & education
20th-century Indian male writers